James Cecil, 3rd Earl of Salisbury,  (1648 – June 1683), known as Viscount Cranborne from 1660 to 1668, was an English nobleman and politician.

Biography
Salisbury was the son of Charles Cecil, Viscount Cranborne, the son of William Cecil, 2nd Earl of Salisbury. His mother was Lady Diana Maxwell. He is said to have attended St John's College, Cambridge. In 1668 he succeeded his grandfather in the earldom. He was invested a Privy Councillor in 1679 and was made a Knight of the Garter a year later, but was expelled from the Council a few months before his death due to his participation in the Rye House Plot.

On 1 October 1661, he married Lady Margaret Manners, a daughter of Francis Manners, 8th Earl of Rutland, and his wife formerly the Hon Frances Montagu.

He died in June 1683 and was succeeded in his titles by his eldest son James.

Family
Lord Salisbury married Lady Margaret Manners, daughter of John Manners, 8th Earl of Rutland, in 1661. She bore him sons James and Robert Cecil (1670–1716) and a daughter Lady Margaret Cecil.

Notes

References

1648 births
1683 deaths
Alumni of St John's College, Cambridge
James, Salisbury 3
James
Knights of the Garter
Members of the Privy Council of England